Irene Cefaro (born 31 August 1935) is an Italian former stage and film actress.

Life and career 
Born in Rome, in 1952 Cefaro won the beauty contest "Miss Roma" and almost immediately attracted the interest of film producers, making her film debut in Il maestro di Don Giovanni (1953). In a few years she got notable roles in films of value directed by Federico Fellini, Carlo Lizzani, Giuseppe De Santis, Luigi Comencini and Raffaello Matarazzo, among others. She prematurely retired from acting in the late 1950s to devote herself to her family.

Selected filmography
 Guai ai vinti  (1954)
Chronicle of Poor Lovers (1955)
Bravissimo (1955)
Destination Piovarolo (1955)
Il Bidone (1955)
The Wolves (1956)
Husbands in the City (1957)
L'amore più bello (1958)
Le donne ci tengono assai (1959)

References

External links 
 

Actresses from Rome
Italian stage actresses
Italian film actresses
20th-century Italian actresses
Italian beauty pageant winners
1935 births

Living people